Iridana hypocala, the Eltringham's sapphire gem, is a butterfly in the family Lycaenidae. It is found in Ghana (the Volta Region), Cameroon, the Democratic Republic of the Congo (Shaba), Uganda and north-western Tanzania. The habitat consists of forests.

Adults are most common in October and November.

References

Butterflies described in 1929
Poritiinae